Kanjibhai Rayabhai Talpada is an Indian politician. He was successful in the 2007 Gujarat Legislative Assembly election and became a member of the 12th Gujarat Legislative Assembly of Indian state of Gujarat. He was a MLA of Indian National Congress from Dholka from 2007 to 2012.

References 

Gujarati people
21st-century Indian politicians
Living people
Year of birth missing (living people)
Indian National Congress politicians from Gujarat